The Ballina Naval & Maritime Museum is a local maritime history museum located in the town of Ballina, New South Wales in Australia. The museum explicitly houses and records the local maritime history of Ballina and the former mariners that reside in the town. Many of the museum's founding members, as well as some current volunteers served in the Royal Australian Navy. The museum features displays and models honouring  events and history from the RAN and navies from other nations.

The museum is located on Regatta avenue, behind the Ballina Tourist information centre. The museum is noted for maintaining in its collection one of the three Las Balsas craft and it also manages the largest naval and merchant ship model collection in Australia.

Collection
The museum has extensive displays featuring:
 The Las Balsas raft
 Port of Ballina and Local History
 Tribute to women in the Navy
 Interactive displays, including the SS Wollongbar
 DVD showings
 A working triple expansion steam engine
 Mark 9 21" Torpedo
 Model Ships

Las Balsas

In 1973, the Las Balsas rafts were towed into Ballina by fishing trawlers after their journey from Ecuador. One of the rafts is preserved in the Ballina Naval and Maritime Museum. They had planned to arrive in Mooloolaba in Queensland, but currents forced them off their course. Their journey was almost twice as long as the Kon-Tiki expeditions of 1947 and proved that people could have travelled across the Pacific in ancient times.

Gallery

See also
List of museums in New South Wales
List of maritime museums

References

Transport museums in New South Wales
Local museums in Australia
Maritime museums in Australia
Ballina, New South Wales